Koro language may refer to:
Koro language (India) — ISO 639-3 jkr
Manus Koro language, also called Lopohan, (New Guinea) — ISO 639-3 kxr
Koro language (Vanuatu) — ISO 639-3 krf
Koro, dialect of Maninka language, (Ivory Coast) — ISO 639-3 kfo
Koro, ethnic name for a group of Plateau languages (Nigeria):
Jili language — ISO 639-3 mgi
Jijili language — ISO 639-3 uji
Koro Nulu language — ISO 639-3 vkn
Koro Zuba language — ISO 639-3 vkz
Koro Wachi language — ISO 639-3 bqv